Erik Holmer (born 5 April 1995) is a Swedish slalom canoeist who has competed at the international level since 2010. He is from Nyköping, Sweden and has resided in both Prague and Pau, France.

Holmer won a bronze medal in the K1 event at the 2018 U23 World Championships in Ivrea, Italy. He earned his best senior world championship result, of 31st, at the 2017 World Championships in Pau. He also finished 4th in the K1 team event at the same championships.

Holmer represented Sweden in the K1 Event at the 2020 Summer Olympics in Tokyo following a strong performance in the opening two rounds of the 2021 World Cup. He qualified 10th fastest for the final, where he finished 9th after receiving a 50-second penalty.

References

External links 

 

1995 births
Living people
Swedish male canoeists
People from Nyköping Municipality
Canoeists at the 2020 Summer Olympics
Olympic canoeists of Sweden
Sportspeople from Södermanland County